Longing is an upcoming American comedy-drama film written and directed by Savi Gabizon and starring Richard Gere.  It is a remake of Gabizon's 2017 Israeli film of the same name.

Cast
Richard Gere as Daniel
Diane Kruger as Alice
Suzanne Clément as Rachel
Marnie McPhail
Stuart Hughes
Jessica Clement

Production
Filming began on September 24, 2022.  Filming occurred in Toronto, Hamilton, Ontario, Cambridge, Ontario and Kitchener, Ontario.

References

External links
 

Upcoming English-language films
American remakes of Israeli films
Upcoming films
Films shot in Ontario